A Tale of Africa (also titled The Green Horizon and  Afurika Monogatari) is a 1980 Japanese drama film directed by Susumu Hani and Simon Trevor and starring James Stewart (In his final live-action theatrically-released film role).

Plot

Cast
James Stewart as Old Man
Philip Sayer as Man
Kathy as Girl
Eleonora Vallone as Woman
Heekura Simba

Production
The film was shot from late 1979 to early 1980 in Kenya.

Release
The film premiered in the United States in 1981 when it aired on Showtime.

Reception
David Parkinson of Radio Times awarded the film two stars out of five.  Leonard Maltin gave it a BOMB rating.

References

External links

Japanese drama films
Films shot in Kenya
Films directed by Susumu Hani
1980s English-language films
English-language Japanese films
1980s Japanese-language films
1980 drama films
1980 multilingual films
Japanese multilingual films
1980s Japanese films